"Rain" is a 1998 single released by the group SWV. The musical backing track is based on Jaco Pastorius's "Portrait of Tracy". Released as the fourth and final single from the group's third album Release Some Tension, the song peaked at number 25 on the US Billboard Hot 100 singles chart and number 7 on the US Hot R&B Singles chart. Singer and actor Tyrese Gibson appeared in the song's 1998 music video, directed by Darren Grant, and would later sing the hook on rapper Chingy's 2006 hit song "Pullin' Me Back", which samples "Rain".

In July 2020, "Rain" was covered by the indie rock group Whitney on their covers album, Candid.

Track listing
US Promo
 Rain (LP Version) 	4:24 	
 Rain (Instrumental) 	4:54 	
 Rain (A Cappella) 	3:55 	
 Rain (Suggested Callout Hook) 	0:13

US CD
 Rain (LP Version) 	4:25 	
 Lose Myself (LP Version) 	4:38

UK CD
 Rain (LP Version) 	4:25 	
 Lose My Cool (Stoney's Pump Mix) 	6:53 	
 Someone (Mosso House Radio Edit) 	3:47

Charts

Year-end charts

References

1997 singles
Music videos directed by Darren Grant
SWV songs
1997 songs
Songs written by Brian Alexander Morgan
RCA Records singles
Songs written by Jaco Pastorius
Contemporary R&B ballads
1990s ballads
Songs about weather